The culture of West Bengal is an Indian culture which has its roots in Bengali literature, music, fine arts, drama and cinema. Different geographic regions of West Bengal have subtle as well as more pronounced variations between each other, with Darjeeling Himalayan hill region and Duars showing particularly different socio-cultural aspects.

West Bengal's capital Kolkata—as the former capital of India—was the birthplace of modern Indian literary and artistic thought,  and is referred to as the "cultural [or literary] capital of India". The presence of paras, which are cluster of neighbourhoods that possess a strong sense of community, is characteristic of West Bengal. Typically, each para has its own community club and, on occasion, a playing field. Residents engage in addas, or leisurely chats, that often take the form of freestyle intellectual conversation. However, with the growth of apartments, expansion of neighbourhoods and rapid urbanization, this culture is on decline.

Literature

The Bengali language boasts a rich literary heritage, shared with neighbouring Bangladesh. West Bengal has a long tradition in folk literature, evidenced by the Charyapada, Mangalkavya, Shreekrishna Kirtana, Thakurmar Jhuli, and stories related to Gopal Bhar. In the nineteenth and twentieth
century, Bengali literature was modernized in the works of authors such as Bankim Chandra Chattopadhyay, Michael Madhusudan Dutt, Rabindranath Tagore, Kazi Nazrul Islam, and Sharat Chandra Chattopadhyay. Coupled with social reforms led by Ram Mohan Roy, Swami Vivekananda, and others, this constituted a major part of the Bengal Renaissance. The middle and latter parts of the 20th century witnessed the arrival of post-modernism, as well as literary movements such as those espoused by the Kallol movement, hungryalists and the little magazines.

Theater and films
Among other types of theater, West Bengal has a tradition of folk drama known as jatra. Kolkata is the home of the Bengali cinema industry, dubbed "Tollywood" for Tollygunj, where most of the state's film studios are located. Its long tradition of art films includes globally acclaimed film directors such as Academy Award-winning director Satyajit Ray, Ritwik Ghatak, Mrinal Sen, Tapan Sinha, and contemporary directors such as Aparna Sen, Buddhadeb Dasgupta, Goutam Ghose, Koushik Ganguly, Rituparno Ghosh, Anjan Dutt, Kamaleswar Mukherjee, Sandip Ray. Uttam Kumar was the most popular lead actor for decades, and his romantic pairing with actress Suchitra Sen in films attained legendary status. Soumitra Chatterjee, who acted in many Satyajit Ray-films, and Prosenjit Chatterjee are among other popular lead male actors. , Bengali films have won India's annual National Film Award for Best Feature Film twenty-two times in sixty seven years, the highest among all Indian languages.

Music

The Baul tradition is a unique heritage of Bengali folk music, which has also been influenced by regional music traditions. Other folk music forms include Kabigaan, Gombhira, Bhawaiya, kirtans, and Gajan festival music. Folk music in West Bengal is often accompanied by the ektara, a one-stringed instrument. West Bengal also has a heritage in North Indian classical music. The state is recognised for its appreciation of rabindrasangeet (songs written by Rabindranath Tagore) and Indian classical music. Nazrul Geeti is another classical music of Bengal, which is written and composed by poet Kazi Nazrul Islam. He was person in Bengal music who created the first Bengali ghazals.

Popular music genres include adhunik songs. Since the early 1990s, new genres have emerged, including one comprising alternative folk–rock Bengali bands. Another new style, jibonmukhi gaan ("songs about life"), is based on realism. UNESCO selected The Rural Craft Hub of Bengal to showcase their artwork in Paris in 2015.

Attire
Though Bengali women traditionally wear the special Benarasi sari and Jamdani,  Western attire has gained acceptance among younger and professional women. Western-style dress has greater acceptance among men, although the traditional costumes like dhoti, panjabi, kurta, pyjama and lungi are seen during weddings and major festivals. Like any other metropolis, Kolkata also has an eclectic mix of western wears with a tinge of ethnic wears. People are found dressed in jeans along with kurtas, or sari along with an overcoat.

Festivals and celebrations

West Bengal is famous for its culture and festivals are an inevitable part of this culture. Some festivals are celebrated statewide, while others are local in nature. There are also various other village fairs and seasonal tribal festivals. Durga Puja is the biggest and most important festival of West Bengal, and it features colourful pandals, decorative idols of Hindu goddess Durga and her family, lighting decoration and immersion processions. Other major festivals are Kali Puja, Diwali, Dol, Saraswati Puja, Jagaddhatri Puja, Rath Jatra, Kojagori Lakshmi Puja, Vishwakarma Puja, Poush Parbon, Poila Boishakh, Christmas. Kolkata Book Fair, Kolkata International Film Festival and Dover Lane Music Festival are major annual cultural events of Kolkata, whereas Poush Mela, Ganga Sagar Mela, Jhapan are some of the major annual fairs of the state. The diverse ethnic populace of Darjeeling Himalayan hill region celebrates several local festivals such as Losar, Dusshera or Fulpati, Tihar, Ram Navami, Maghe Sankranti, Chotrul Duchen, Buddha Jayanti, Tendong Lho Rumfaat, Eid al-Fitr etc.

West Bengal has a long tradition of popular literature, music and drama largely based on Bengali folklore and Hindu epics and Puranas.

See also
 Architecture of Bengal 
 Arts of West Bengal
 Bengali cuisine 
 Bengal School of Art
 Bengali folk literature
 Culture of Bengal
 Culture of Darjeeling
 Culture of India
 Kalighat painting
 Music of Bengal
 Music of West Bengal
 Christianity in West Bengal

References